Walter Franzot (born November 22, 1949) is a retired Italian professional football player.

He played nine seasons (184 games, 8 goals) in the Serie A for Roma and Verona

He was born in Cervignano del Friuli.

References

1949 births
Living people
People from Cervignano del Friuli
Italian footballers
Italy under-21 international footballers
Serie A players
Udinese Calcio players
A.S. Roma players
Hellas Verona F.C. players
Calcio Montebelluna players
Association football defenders
Footballers from Friuli Venezia Giulia